This is a list of Norton branded motorcycles over all periods of the marque from 1908 to the present day.

Model list

Pre-War (1908–1939)

War time (1937–1945)

Post-War (1945–1970)

Superbike era (1967–1978)

Norton Commando models used "Isolastic" engine mounts (rubber mounted) and had 745 cc ("750") engines up to 1973 when the 828 cc ("850") engine came into use.

Rotary period (1981–1992)

Post Rotary period (2014 onwards)

See also
List of AMC motorcycles
List of Ariel motorcycles
List of BSA motorcycles
List of Douglas motorcycles
List of Royal Enfield motorcycles
List of Triumph motorcycles
List of Velocette motorcycles
List of Vincent motorcycles

Sources
 Holliday, Bob (1976). Norton Story. Cambridge: Patrick Stephens Limited.

References

Norton
 
Norton